Jerolim may refer to:

 Jerolim, Croatian masculine given name
 Jerolim Kavanjin, Croatian poet
 Jerolim Miše, Croatian painter, teacher, and art critic
 Jerolim (island), an uninhabited island near Hvar, Croatia

See also
 Jeronim (disambiguation)
 Jere (name)

Croatian masculine given names